Rubanda is a town in the extreme southwest of the Western Region of Uganda. It serves as the commercial, political and administrative center of Rubanda District.

Location
The town's geographical coordinates are: 01°11'11.0"S, 29°50'36.0"E (Latitude:-1.186389; Longitude:29.843333).

Points of interest
The Kabale–Kisoro–Bunagana Road passes through Rubanda town in a north to south direction.

See also
 Henry Banyenzaki
 George Wilson Kanyeihamba

References

External links
 New Rubanda District Wants More Sub Counties

Rubanda District
Kigezi sub-region
Populated places in Western Region, Uganda